Monica Patricia Dominguez Lara (born ) is a Mexican weightlifter, competing in the 58 kg category and representing Mexico at international competitions. 

She competed at world championships, most recently at the 2015 World Weightlifting Championships. 
She participated at the 2016 Summer Olympics.

Major results

References

External links
http://www.the-sports.org/monica-patricia-dominguez-lara-weightlifting-spf319519.html
http://www.nbcolympics.com/news/weightlifting-recap-mens-62kg-and-womens-58kg 
http://www.gettyimages.com/photos/patricia-dominguez?excludenudity=true&sort=mostpopular&mediatype=photography&phrase=patricia%20dominguez
http://www.zimbio.com/pictures/n9SFuUD1qb5/Weightlifting+Olympics+Day+3/T9op5XIyDQU/Monica+Patricia+Dominguez+Lara
https://www.youtube.com/watch?v=vnNpi415IDY

1988 births
Living people
Mexican female weightlifters
Place of birth missing (living people)
Weightlifters at the 2016 Summer Olympics
Olympic weightlifters of Mexico
Universiade bronze medalists for Mexico
Universiade medalists in weightlifting
20th-century Mexican women
21st-century Mexican women